Nicholas III Grammatikos or Grammaticus (? – May 1111) was an Eastern Orthodox patriarch of Constantinople (1084–1111).

Educated in Constantinople, Nicholas spent much of his early years in Pisidian Antioch, where it is believed he took his monastic vows. He eventually left the city around 1068 when it was threatened by Seljuk Turkish raids. Moving to Constantinople, he founded a monastery dedicated to John the Baptist. In 1084, Alexios I Komnenos selected him to replace the deposed patriarch Eustratius Garidas.

By nature a conciliarist, Nicholas was immediately presented with a number of delicate and difficult issues. He took the emperor's side in the case of Leo of Chalcedon, who protested over Alexios' confiscation of church treasures to alleviate the financial strain the Byzantine-Norman Wars had caused, which was resolved when he presided over the Council of Blachernae. He was also prominent in the fight against doctrinal heresy, for instance Nicholas condemned as heretical the Bogomil leader Basil the Physician. But he was very cautious in the ongoing conflict between the provincial metropolitans and the Patriarchate. In spite of some hostile opposition from the clergy of Hagia Sophia, he ended up supporting Niketas of Ankyra against the emperor's right to elevate metropolitans, and exerted a great deal of energy trying to restrict the influence of the Chartophylax. Nicholas was also very concerned with ecclesiastical discipline. He wrote a monastic Rule for Mount Athos monastery, while ordering the removal of the Vlachs from Mount Athos. He also rigorously enforced the regulations around fasting.

Meanwhile, the ongoing political situation in the Byzantine Empire especially in Anatolia after the disaster of the Battle of Manzikert forced Nicholas to seek a union with Pope Urban II, though he was firm in his views about the major contentious issues of the day, principally the Filioque, the azymes, and Papal Primacy.

Nicholas died in April or May 1111 at Constantinople.

References

External links
 Encyclopædia Britannica

11th-century patriarchs of Constantinople
12th-century patriarchs of Constantinople
1111 deaths